Andrea Rán Snæfeld Hauksdóttir (born 28 January 1996) is an Icelandic footballer who plays as a midfielder for Club América of the Liga MX Femenil. She debuted for the Icelandic national football team in 2016.

College
Andrea played college football for the University of South Florida. She was named the American Athletic Conference midfielder of the year in 2018 and 2019.

Andrea played for Breiðablik from 2011 to 2021. She was loaned to Le Havre for part of the 2021 season an later signed with Houston Dash. In 2022 she signed with Club América of the Liga MX Femenil.

Achievements

Titles
Úrvalsdeild kvenna
 2015, 2018
Icelandic Cup
 2016, 2018
Icelandic Super Cup
 2014, 2016

Awards
American Athletic Conference Midfielder of the Year
2018, 2019
American Athletic Conference All-Conference First Team
2017, 2018, 2019

References

External links
 
 USF Profile
 Breiðablik Profile

1996 births
Living people
Women's association football defenders
Andrea Rán Snæfeld Hauksdóttir
Andrea Rán Snæfeld Hauksdóttir
Andrea Rán Snæfeld Hauksdóttir
Andrea Rán Snæfeld Hauksdóttir
Women's association football midfielders
South Florida Bulls women's soccer players
National Women's Soccer League players
Houston Dash players